is a Prefectural Natural Park in southern Hyōgo Prefecture, Japan. Established in 1961, the park spans the municipalities of Himeji, Kakogawa, Kasai, and Ono.

See also
 National Parks of Japan

References

External links
  Map of Harima Chūbu Kyūryō Prefectural Natural Park

Parks and gardens in Hyōgo Prefecture
Protected areas established in 1961
1961 establishments in Japan